Media (AK-83) was a World War II US navy ship that was never commissioned and thus never bore the USS designation.

Media (AK-83) was contracted to be built as Oliver R. Mumford under Maritime Commission contract 4 September 1941 as a type N3-M-A1 cargo ship. She was acquired by the Navy 1 January 1943 before being laid down by Penn-Jersey Shipbuilding Corp., Camden, New Jersey, 28 January 1943; launched 29 August 1943; sponsored by Mrs. Ernest G. Bornheimer;  completed and delivered to Navy on 17 November 1943.

That same day Media was delivered to the U.S. Army and struck from the Navy list on  24 November 1943. The ship was renamed Glenn Gerald Griswold after an engineering officer killed while fighting a dump fire in Naples, Italy. The Glenn Gerald Griswold was converted into a port repair ship by Bethlehem Fairfield Shipyard, Inc., Baltimore, Maryland, on 5 June 1944 and sailed for Europe by summer's end. After the postwar work the ship was placed in the reserve fleet.

Notes

References

External links 
 NavSource Online: Service Ship Photo Archive - AK-83 Media - USAT Glenn Gerald Griswold

 

Port repair ships of the United States Army
Enceladus-class cargo ships
Ships built in Camden, New Jersey
1943 ships
Type N3 ships of the United States Army
World War II auxiliary ships of the United States